literally means sixth street in Japanese. It can refer to:

People
Emperor Rokujō, the 79th Emperor of Japan
the Rokujō family, a poetically conservative faction in the Japanese Imperial court
Lady Rokujō, a character in the Tale of Genji
 Miyuki Rokujō, a fictional character in Strawberry Panic!—see List of Strawberry Panic! characters

Places
, one of east–west streets in the ancient capital of Heian-kyō, present-day Kyoto
Rokujō Station, a train station on the JR West Etsumi-Hoku Line in Fukui, Fukui, Japan